Rodrigo Rojo (born 21 July 1989 in Montevideo) is an Uruguayan defender player who currently plays for Defensor Sporting.

Club statistics

Updated to games played as of 26 October 2014.

References

External links
 HLSZ 
 

Living people
1989 births
Footballers from Montevideo
Uruguayan footballers
Uruguayan expatriate footballers
Association football defenders
Rampla Juniors players
Club Atlético Fénix players
Újpest FC players
Sint-Truidense V.V. players
Club Olimpia footballers
Club Nacional footballers
Peñarol players
Defensor Sporting players
Challenger Pro League players
Uruguayan Primera División players
Paraguayan Primera División players
Nemzeti Bajnokság I players
Expatriate footballers in Belgium
Uruguayan expatriate sportspeople in Belgium
Expatriate footballers in Hungary
Uruguayan expatriate sportspeople in Hungary
Expatriate footballers in Paraguay
Uruguayan expatriate sportspeople in Paraguay